Valdis Eyzhenovich (Yevgenyevich) Pelsh (rus. Валдис Евгеньевич Пельш, born 5 June 1967 in Riga) is a Latvian-born Soviet and Russian television presenter, television director, television producer and musician, winner of two TEFI awards (in 1997 and 2005). Valdis Pelšs currently works as a screen actor and manages child programs subdivision on Channel One. He hosted several popular game shows, such as Ugadai Melodiu, Russian Roulette and Rozygrysh. 
Pelšs is a former vocalist and percussion instrument player for Neschastny Sluchai, a band founded by him and Alexei Kortnev in 1983.

Career 
Valdis Pelšs graduated from the Lomonosov Moscow State University (MSU), Faculty of Philosophy. He first appeared on television as a contestant on the KVN show as part of the MSU team with his friend Alexei Kortnev (1987). Together they also participated in Oba-na. A few years earlier, in 1983, they had formed an alternative rock band called Neschastny Sluchai (the band's name meaning "unfortunate event" in Russian), which Pelšs would leave in 1997.

In 1995 Vladislav Listyev invited him to work on the musical game show Ugadai Melodiu, a Russian version of Name That Tune aired  on Channel One. The show quickly gained popularity: it achieved a viewer share of 96%, for which Valdis Pelšs was inducted in The Guinness Book of Records as the most popular Russian television personality. After the death of Sergei Suponev in 2001 Pelšs manages child programs subdivision on Channel One. For his work as a TV host he received TEFI awards in 1997 and 2005.

Shows hosted 
 Ugadai Melodiu
 Ugadai i kompania (Ugadaika)
 Russian Roulette
 Vlastelin Vkusa
 Eti Zabavnye Zhyvotnye
 Rozygrysh
 Odni doma
 Wheel Of Fortune (Pole Chudes) (Appears twice of each episode on 27th of December, 2002 and 30th of December, 2002)

Filmography
 1998: Na boykom meste
 2000: Brother 2 (as himself)
 2005: The Turkish Gambit
 2007: Zolushka.ru (as himself)
 2007: Lubov morkov
 2008: Snezhniy chelovek
 2018: Arctic Brotherhood. Documentary about Soviet and British air forces cooperation (This is a documentary about Soviet and British air forces cooperation in Murmansk mid-air during September–November of 1941)

References

External links 
 
  Neschastny Sluchai official website
  Valdis Pelsh at the Channel One.

1967 births
Television people from Riga
Russian game show hosts
Russian male actors
Moscow State University alumni
Living people
KVN
Russian people of Latvian descent